Al Mearad is a district in Qatar, located in the municipality of Al Rayyan.

In the 2015 census, it was listed as a district of zone no. 55 which has a population of 283,675 and also includes New Fereej Al Ghanim, Al Aziziya, Al Waab, Fereej Al Soudan, Muaither, Bu Sidra, Fereej Al Manaseer, Fereej Al Murra and Al Sailiya. 

Al Sailiya is located to the immediate north of the district while the Doha Industrial Area is south.

Etymology
The term "mearad" in Arabic means "obstruction". This name came about due to the fact that the district lies in the pathway of a nearby rawda (depression).

Infrastructure
Ashghal (The Public Works Authority) launched a QR 6.6 million project to construct a religious complex in Al Mearad in November 2013. Maha Al Khaleej for Contracting Co. was selected as the contractor. As part of the project, a 1300 worshipper capacity mosque, an imam's house and a Quran learning center were constructed.

Education

The following schools are located in Al Mearad:

References

Populated places in Al Rayyan